Diploderma ngoclinense is a species of lizard native to Vietnam.

References 

Diploderma
Reptiles of Vietnam
Reptiles described in 2017
Taxa named by Natalia B. Ananjeva
Taxa named by Nikolai Loutseranovitch Orlov